Lewis Goodall (born 1 July 1989) is an English journalist and author. He is best known in his roles as a political correspondent for Sky News, the policy editor of the BBC's Newsnight, and Analysis and Investigations Editor for The News Agents on Global.

Early life
Goodall was born on 1 July 1989. A native of Birmingham, Goodall grew up on a council estate in Longbridge and attended the local Turves Green Boys' School and completed his A Levels at Cadbury Sixth Form College. He went to study at St John's College, Oxford, graduating with a degree in history and politics in 2010. He was the first in his family to go to university. Goodall was an activist for the Labour Party whilst at university and also a blogger.

Goodall worked for the centre-left think tank the Institute for Public Policy Research and also as a question writer for the quiz show University Challenge.

Career
Goodall began his career as a producer and reporter at the BBC in 2012, where he reported for Victoria Derbyshire and BBC Radio Four. He worked at the BBC until 2016 when he left to join Sky News, where he was a political correspondent.

Goodall conducted the last interview with Labour Party politician Denis Healey before his death in October 2015.

In September 2018, Goodall published his first book, Left for Dead?: The Strange Death and Rebirth of the Labour Party, an analysis of New Labour and Jeremy Corbyn.

In January 2020, Goodall returned to the BBC to join Newsnight as its policy editor. His appointment was met with some criticism by Conservatives because, according to The Telegraph, Goodall had "made no secret of his political views" during his previous role at Sky News. Brexit supporters also accused him of being an "anti-Brexit activist".

Goodall also occasionally writes for the New Statesman as a guest. In August 2020 he wrote on the A-level grading scandal for which he was nominated for an Orwell Prize in 2021. 

Goodall has featured in the BBC's election night coverage.

Around June 2022, Goodall joined media company Global Media & Entertainment to make a daily podcast (The News Agents with Emily Maitlis and Jon Sopel). He stated on Twitter he would be remaining at Newsnight for "a while yet". The News Agents was launched on 30 August 2022.

References

External links

Living people
1989 births
Alumni of St John's College, Oxford
BBC newsreaders and journalists
English political journalists
English political writers
Labour Party (UK) people
People from Birmingham, West Midlands
Sky News newsreaders and journalists